is a junction railway station in the city of Tsushima, Aichi Prefecture, Japan, operated by Meitetsu.

Lines

Station layout
The station has a single elevated island platform with the station building underneath. Trains of both the Bisai Line and the Tsushima Line use the same platform. The station is staffed.

Platforms

Adjacent stations

|-
!colspan=5|Nagoya Railroad

Station history
Tsushima Station was opened on April 3, 1893, as a terminal station of the privately owned  Bisai Railroad, on the same day as the opposing terminal, Yatomi Station,  and Saya Station.  Meitetsu bought the Bisai Railroad on August 1, 1925.  On October 25, 1932, former Shin-Tsushima Station on Meitetsu's Tsushima Line was rebuilt as part of Tsushima Station. The tracks were elevated and station rebuilt in 1968.

Passenger statistics
In fiscal 2015, the station was used by an average of 1608 passengers daily.

Surrounding area
Tsushima City Hospital
Tsushima Shrine

See also
 List of Railway Stations in Japan

References

External links

 Official web page 

Railway stations in Japan opened in 1898
Railway stations in Aichi Prefecture
Stations of Nagoya Railroad
Tsushima, Aichi